A , tomte, or  is a mythological creature from Nordic folklore today typically associated with the winter solstice and the Christmas season. They are generally described as being short, having a long white beard, and wearing a conical or knit cap in gray, red or some other bright colour. They often have an appearance somewhat similar to that of a garden gnome.

The nisse is one of the most familiar creatures of Scandinavian folklore, and he has appeared in many works of Scandinavian literature. With the romanticisation and collection of folklore during the 19th century, the nisse gained popularity.

Terminology

The word nisse is a pan-Scandinavian term. Its current use in Norway into the 19th century is evidenced in Asbjørnsen's collection. The Norwegian  is also equated to nisse or tomte.

English translations
While the term nisse in the native Norwegian is retained in Pat Shaw Iversen's English translation (1960), appended with the parenthetical remark that it is a household spirit, H. L. Braekstad (1881) chose to substitute nisse with "brownie". Brynildsen's dictionary (1927) glossed nisse as 'goblin' or 'hobgoblin'.

In the English editions of the Hans Christian Andersen's fairy tales the Danish word  has been translated as 'goblin', for example, in the tale "The Goblin at the Grocer's".

Dialects
Forms such as  have been seen as dialect. Aasen noted the variant form  to be prevalent in the Nordland and Trondheim areas of Norway, and the tale "Tuftefolket på Sandflesa" published by Asbjørnsen is localized in Træna in Nordland. Another synonym is tunkall ("yard fellow") also found in the north and west.

Thus ostensibly  prevails in eastern Norway (and adjoining Sweden), although there are caveats attached to such over-generalizations by linguist . It might also be conceded that  is more a Swedish term than Norwegian. In Scania, Halland and Blekinge the Nisse also known as goanisse (Godnisse, Goenisse≈the good Nisse).

The Norsk Allkunnebok encyclopedia was of the view that nisse was introduced from Denmark relatively late, and that native names found in Norway such as tomte, tufte, tuftekall, etc., date much older.

Etymology
The term nisse may be derived from Old Norse , meaning "dear little relative". Another explanation is that it is a corruption of Nils, the Scandinavian form of Nicholas. A conjecture has also been advanced that nisse might be related to the "nixie", but this is a water-sprite and the proper cognate is the nøkk, not the nisse.

The Finnish  is also derived from the term for a place of residence and area of influence: the house lot,  (Finnish).

Additional synonyms
Norwegian  is a synonym for nisse, or has become conflated ("mixed up") with it. Likewise  is a synonym.

Near synonyms

History and cultural relevance

According to tradition, the nisse lives in the houses and barns of the farmstead, and secretly acts as their guardian. If treated well, they protect the family and animals from evil and misfortune, and may also aid the chores and farm work. However, they are known to be short tempered, especially when offended. Once insulted, they will usually play tricks, steal items and even maim or kill livestock.

Appearance

The nisse/tomte was often imagined as a small, elderly man (size varies from a few inches to about half the height of an adult man), often with a full beard; dressed in the traditional farmer garb, consisting of a pull-over woolen tunic belted at the waist and knee breeches with stockings. This was still the common male dress in rural Scandinavia in the 17th century, giving an indication of when the idea of the nisse spread. However, there are also folktales where he is believed to be a shapeshifter able to take a shape far larger than an adult man, and other tales where the nisse is believed to have a single, Cyclopean eye. In modern Denmark, nisser are often seen as beardless, wearing grey and red woolens with a red cap. Since nisser are thought to be skilled in illusions and sometimes able to make themselves invisible, one was unlikely to get more than brief glimpses of him no matter what he looked like. Norwegian folklore states that he has four fingers, and sometimes with pointed ears and eyes reflecting light in the dark, like those of a cat.

Height

Temperament

Despite his small size, nisse possess immense strength. They are easily offended by carelessness, lack of proper respect, and lazy farmers. As the protector of the farm and caretaker of livestock, their retributions for bad practices range from small pranks like a hard strike to the ear to more severe punishment like killing of livestock or ruining of the farm's fortune. Observance of traditions is thought to be important to the nisse, as they do not like changes in the way things are done at their farms. They are also easily offended by rudeness; farm workers swearing, urinating in the barns, or not treating the creatures well can frequently lead to a sound thrashing by the tomte/nisse. If anyone spills something on the floor in the nisse‘s house, it is considered proper to shout a warning to the tomte below. 

One is also expected to please nisse with gifts (see ) – a traditional gift is a bowl of porridge on Christmas Eve. If the tomte is not given his gift, he might leave the farm or house or engage in mischief such as tying the cows' tails together in the barn, turning objects upside-down, and breaking things (like a troll). The nisse likes his porridge with a pat of butter on the top. In an often retold story, a farmer put the butter underneath the porridge. When the nisse of his farmstead found that the butter was missing, he was filled with rage and killed the cow resting in the barn. But, as he thus became hungry, he went back to his porridge (ricepudding) and ate it, and so found the butter at the bottom of the bowl. Full of grief, he then hurried to search the lands to find another farmer with an identical cow, and replaced the former with the latter. In another tale a Norwegian maid decided to eat the porridge herself, and ended up severely beaten by the nisse. The being swore: "Have you eaten the porridge for the nisse, you have to dance with him!". The farmer found her nearly lifeless the morning after.

The nisse is connected to farm animals in general, but his most treasured animal is the horse. Belief has it that one could see which horse was the tomte's favourite as it will be especially healthy and well taken care of. Sometimes the tomte will even braid its hair and tail. Undoing these braids without permission can mean misfortune or angering the tomte. Some stories tell how the nisse could drive people mad or bite them. The bite from a nisse is poisonous, and otherworldly healing is usually required. As the story goes, a girl who was bitten withered and died before help arrived.

An angry tomte is featured in the popular children's book by Swedish author ,  (The Wonderful Adventures of Nils). The tomte turns the naughty boy Nils into a pixie in the beginning of the book, and Nils then travels across Sweden on the back of a goose.

After Christianization

"house lot man").

The nisse was not always a popular figure, particularly during and after the Christianization of Scandinavia. Like most creatures of folklore he would be seen as heathen (pre-Christian) and be demonized and connected to the Devil. Folklore added other negative beliefs about the tomte, such as that having a tomte on the farm meant you put the fate of your soul at risk, or that you had to perform various non-Christian rites to lure a tomte to your farm.

The belief in a nisse's tendency to bring riches to the farm by his unseen work could also be dragged into the conflicts between neighbours. If one farmer was doing far better for himself than the others, someone might say that it was because he had a nisse on the farm, doing "ungodly" work and stealing from the neighbours. These rumours could be very damaging for the farmer who found himself accused, much like accusations of witchcraft during the Inquisitions.

Similar folklore

These beings are social, however, whereas the nisse is always solitary (though he is now often pictured with other nisser). In Finland, the sauna has a saunatonttu. Also related is the Nis Puk, which is widespread in the area of Southern Jutland/Schleswig, in the Danish-German border area.

In other European folklore, there are many beings similar to the nisse, such as the Scots and English brownie, Northumbrian English hob, West Country pixie, the German , the Dutch  or the Slavic . Usage in folklore in expressions such as Nisse god dräng ("Nisse good lad") is suggestive of Robin Goodfellow.

Modern Nisse

The tomte is accompanied by another mythological creature: the Yule goat. The pair appear on Christmas Eve, knocking on the doors of people's homes, handing out presents.

The nisse will deliver gifts at the door, in accordance with the modern-day tradition of the visiting Santa Claus,  enters homes to hand out presents. The tomte/nisse is also commonly seen with a pig, another popular Christmas symbol in Scandinavia, probably related to fertility and their role as guardians of the farmstead. It is customary to leave behind a bowl of porridge with butter for the tomte/nisse, in gratitude for the services rendered.

In the 1840s the farm's  became the bearer of Christmas presents in Denmark, and was then called  (Yule Nisse). In 1881, the Swedish magazine  published Viktor Rydberg's poem "Tomten", where the tomte is alone awake in the cold Christmas night, pondering the mysteries of life and death. This poem featured the first painting by Jenny Nyström of this traditional Swedish mythical character which she turned into the white-bearded, red-capped friendly figure associated with Christmas ever since.

Gradually, commercialism has made him look more and more like the American Santa Claus, but the Swedish , the Norwegian , the Danish  and the Finnish  (in Finland he is still called the Yule Goat, although his animal features have disappeared) still has features and traditions that are rooted in the local culture. He doesn't live on the North Pole, but perhaps in a forest nearby, or in Denmark he lives on Greenland, and in Finland he lives in Lapland; he doesn't come down the chimney at night, but through the front door, delivering the presents directly to the children, just like the Yule Goat did; he is not overweight; and even if he nowadays sometimes rides in a sleigh drawn by reindeer, instead of just walking around with his sack, his reindeer don't fly — and in Sweden, Denmark and Norway some still put out a bowl of porridge for him on Christmas Eve. He is still often pictured on Christmas cards and house and garden decorations as the little man of Jenny Nyström's imagination, often with a horse or cat, or riding on a goat or in a sled pulled by a goat, and for many people the idea of the farm tomte still lives on, if only in the imagination and literature.

The traditional word tomte lives on in an idiom, referring to the human caretaker of a property, as well as referring to someone in one's building who mysteriously does someone a favour, such as hanging up one's laundry. A person might also wish for a little  to tidy up for them. A tomte stars in one of author Jan Brett's children's stories, Hedgie's Surprise. When adapting the mainly English-language concept of  having helpers (sometimes in a workshop),  can also correspond to the Christmas elf, either replacing it completely, or simply lending its name to the elf-like depictions in the case of translations.

Nisser/tomte often appear in Christmas calendar TV series and other modern fiction. In some versions the tomte are portrayed as very small; in others they are human-sized. The nisse usually exist hidden from humans and are often able to use magic.

The 2018 animated series Hilda, as well as the graphic novel series it is based on, features a nisse named Tontu as a recurring character. He is portrayed as a small, hairy humanoid who lives unseen in the main character's home.

Garden gnome

See also

 Brownie (Scotland and England)
  (Slavic)
  (Spain, Hispanic America)
 Dwarf
 Elf
 Christmas elf
 Gnome
  (Germany)
  (The Netherlands)
 Hob (Northern England)
 Household deity
  (Roman)
 List of Lithuanian household gods
  (Germany)
 Legendary creature
 Leprechaun (Ireland)
  (in Schleswig/Southern Jutland, now divided between Denmark (Northern Schleswig) and Germany (Southern Schleswig)
 Santa Claus
 Sprite
 Tudigong
 
 Yule Lads (Iceland)

Explanatory notes

References

Citations

General bibliography 

 

 

 Nasjonalbiblioteket copy

 

 

 

 

 

 

 ; pdf text via Academia.edu

Related reading
 , Ebbe Schön (1996), 
 Viktor Rydberg's The Tomten in English
 , Kierkegaard, Concluding Unscientific Postscript (Hong, 1992), p. 40
 The Tomten, by Astrid Lindgren

External links

 "Tomten", poem in Swedish by Viktor Rydberg

Christmas characters
Christmas gift-bringers
Danish folklore
Gnomes
Holiday characters
Household deities
Norwegian folklore
Scandinavian legendary creatures
Swedish folklore
Tutelary deities